Brett Quigley (born August 18, 1969) is an American professional golfer. He currently plays on the PGA Tour Champions, where he won the 2020 Morocco Champions. He was previously a member of the PGA Tour and the Korn Ferry Tour.

Early life
Brett Quigley was born on August 18, 1969 in Fort Devens, Massachusetts. He is the nephew of PGA Tour and Champions Tour golfer Dana Quigley. He won the 1987 U.S. Junior Amateur and attended the University of South Carolina, where he was twice an Academic All-American, before turning professional in 1991.

Professional career
Quigley has spent his career bouncing between the PGA Tour and the second tier Korn Ferry Tour. His best finish on the main tour is second, but he has two wins on the lower tour, the 1996 Nike Philadelphia Classic, and the 2001 Buy.com Arkansas Classic. 

Quigley finished in the top 20 of the PGA Tour money list in 2006 and his career earnings exceed $11,000,000.

On February 1, 2020, Quigley won the Morocco Champions on the PGA Tour Champions.

Quigley resides in Jupiter, Florida.

Amateur wins
this list may be incomplete
1987 U.S. Junior Amateur
1988 Northeast Amateur

Professional wins (4)

Buy.com Tour wins (2)

Other wins (1)
1994 New England Open

PGA Tour Champions wins (1)

Results in major championships

CUT = missed the half-way cut
"T" = tied

Results in The Players Championship

CUT = missed the halfway cut
"T" indicates a tie for a place

Results in World Golf Championships

QF, R16, R32, R64 = Round in which player lost in match play
"T" = Tied

Results in senior major championships

CUT = missed the halfway cut
"T" indicates a tie for a place
NT = No tournament due to COVID-19 pandemic

See also
1996 Nike Tour graduates
2002 PGA Tour Qualifying School graduates

References

External links

American male golfers
South Carolina Gamecocks men's golfers
PGA Tour golfers
PGA Tour Champions golfers
Korn Ferry Tour graduates
Golfers from Massachusetts
Golfers from Florida
People from Jupiter, Florida
1969 births
Living people